Phosphoribosylamine (PRA) is a biochemical intermediate in the formation of purine nucleotides via inosine-5-monophosphate, and hence is a building block for DNA and RNA. The vitamins thiamine and cobalamin also contain fragments derived from PRA.

It is the product of the enzyme amidophosphoribosyltransferase which attaches ammonia from glutamine to phosphoribosyl pyrophosphate (PRPP) at its anomeric carbon:
 +  →  +  + PPi
The biosynthesis pathway next combines PRA with glycine in a process driven by ATP giving glycineamide ribonucleotide (GAR). The enzyme phosphoribosylamine—glycine ligase catalyses the reaction forming an amide bond:
  +  + ATP →  + ADP + Pi

See also
 5-Aminoimidazole ribotide
 Purine metabolism

References

Organophosphates
Amino sugars